Let's See is an American game show that aired on the ABC Network on Thursday nights from July 14, 1955 to August 25, 1955.

Premise
Filmed at Atlantic City Convention Hall in Atlantic City, New Jersey, the series featured panelists attempting to discover through indirect questions what attractions contestants had seen in Atlantic City. The program was sponsored by the Atlantic City Chamber of Commerce.

Host
 John Reed King

References

1955 American television series debuts
1955 American television series endings
American Broadcasting Company original programming
Television shows set in New Jersey
Television shows filmed in New Jersey
1950s American game shows
Television game shows with incorrect disambiguation